Last Warning is a compilation album by hardcore punk band Agnostic Front. It was released in 1993 on Relativity Records, marketed by Roadrunner Records, and follows 1992's studio album, One Voice.

The first eleven tracks—often consisting of two songs strung together—were recorded live in December 1992 at CBGB in New York City. The remainder of the CD is the band's 1983 7-inch EP, United Blood. It contrasts the later crossover thrash style the band had adopted in later releases with the raw New York hardcore style of their debut release. The album was originally intended to be the band's last release, but they reformed some five years later and released the album Something's Gotta Give.

Track listing
All songs written by Agnostic Front, except for "Crucified" (Iron Cross).

Personnel

Tracks 1–11
Agnostic Front
 Roger Miret – vocals
 Vinnie Stigma – lead guitar
 Matt Henderson – rhythm guitar
 Craig Setari – bass
 Will Shepler – drums
Production
 Recorded live at CBGB on December 20, 1992
 Produced by Don Fury
 Engineered by Rick Roy
 Mixed at Don Fury Studios by Don Kiddick

Tracks 12–22
Agnostic Front
 Roger Miret – vocals
 Vinnie Stigma – guitars
 Adam Moochie – bass
 Raybeez – drums
Production
 Tracks taken from the United Blood 7-inch EP, released in 1983 on Last Warning Records
 Produced by Agnostic Front and Stephen Elliott

External links
Agnostic Front official website

Agnostic Front albums
1993 compilation albums
Albums produced by Don Fury